The 2012 Coca-Cola 600, the 53rd annual race, was a NASCAR Sprint Cup Series stock car race held on May 27, 2012, at Charlotte Motor Speedway in Concord, North Carolina. Contested over 400 laps, it was the twelfth race of the 2012 season. Kasey Kahne of Hendrick Motorsports took his first win of the season, while Denny Hamlin finished second and Kyle Busch finished third.

Report

Background

Charlotte Motor Speedway is one of ten intermediate tracks to hold NASCAR races; the others are Atlanta Motor Speedway, Kansas Speedway, Chicagoland Speedway, Darlington Raceway, Homestead Miami Speedway, New Hampshire Motor Speedway, Kentucky Speedway, Las Vegas Motor Speedway, and Texas Motor Speedway. The track's turns are banked at twenty-four degrees, while the front stretch, the location of the finish line, is five degrees. The back stretch, opposite of the front, also had a five degree banking. The racetrack has seats for 140,000 spectators.

Before the race, Greg Biffle led the Drivers' Championship with 411 points, while Matt Kenseth stood in second with 409. Dale Earnhardt Jr. was third in the Drivers' Championship with 397 points, three points ahead of Denny Hamlin and twenty-five ahead of Jimmie Johnson in fourth and fifth. Martin Truex Jr. with 372 was three points ahead of Tony Stewart, as Kevin Harvick with 361 points, was twelve ahead of Kyle Busch, and twenty-four in front of Carl Edwards. In the Manufacturers' Championship, Chevrolet was leading with 72 points, eight ahead of Toyota. Ford, with 57 points, was eight points ahead of Dodge in the battle for third. Harvick was the race's defending race winner after winning it in 2011.

The Coca-Cola 600 was conceived by race car driver Curtis Turner, who built the Charlotte Motor Speedway. It was first held in 1960 in an attempt by NASCAR to stage a Memorial Day weekend race to compete with the open-wheel Indianapolis 500; the two races were held together on the same day starting from 1974. The race is the longest in terms of distance on the NASCAR calendar and is considered by several drivers to be one of the sport's most important races alongside the Daytona 500, the Brickyard 400 and the Southern 500. The long distance makes it the most physically demanding event in NASCAR, and teams adapt to changing track conditions because the race occurs between late afternoon and evening. It was known as the World 600 until 1984 when The Coca-Cola Company purchased the naming rights to the race and renamed it the Coca-Cola World 600 in 1985. It has been called the Coca-Cola 600 every year since 1986 except for 2002 when the name changed to Coca-Cola Racing Family 600.

Practice and qualifying

Three practice sessions were held before the race; the first on May 24, 2012, which lasted 120 minutes. The second and third took place on Saturday, May 26, 2012. The first Saturday practice lasted 55 minutes, while the second was 60 minutes. Marcos Ambrose was quickest with a time of 28.539 seconds in the first session, five-thousandths of a second faster than Landon Cassill. A. J. Allmendinger was third quickest, followed by Biffle, Clint Bowyer, and Aric Almirola. Joey Logano was seventh, still within two-tenths of a second of Ambrose's time.

Forty-seven cars were entered for qualifying on May 24, 2012, but only forty-three could qualify for the race because of NASCAR's qualifying procedure. Almirola of Richard Petty Motorsports clinched the first pole position of his Sprint Cup Series career, with a time of 27.988 seconds. He was joined on the front row of the grid by his teammate Ambrose. Johnson qualified third, Biffle took fourth, and Bowyer started fifth. Mark Martin, Kasey Kahne, Hamlin, Paul Menard and Regan Smith rounded out the top ten. Kurt Busch failed to finish his qualifying lap after colliding into the SAFER barrier, but will remain on the grid as his team is in the Top 35 in owner's points. The four drivers that failed to qualify for the race were Mike Bliss, David Reutimann, J. J. Yeley and Scott Riggs.

Once the qualifying session was completed, Almirola stated "It's a huge honor just to see it in victory lane (for the pole celebration). I'm driving probably the most iconic car in history of the sport. It's just qualifying, but that's a start." Afterward, Johnson, who won the week before in the NASCAR Sprint All-Star Race XXVIII, commented about their recent performances, "I'm real proud of where our equipment is going." He continued, "I've been able to race better than where we qualify."

In the second practice session, Hamlin was fastest with a time of 28.995 seconds, less than two-hundredths of a second quicker than second-placed Menard. Edwards took third place, ahead of Truex Jr., Johnson and Brad Keselowski. Bowyer, Harvick and Ryan Newman completed the ten quickest drivers in the session. In the third and final practice, Keselowski was quickest with a time of 29.397 seconds. Edwards followed in second, ahead of Martin and Johnson. Logano was fifth quickest, with a time of 29.521 seconds. Stewart, Kenseth, Allmendinger, Kurt Busch, and Jeff Burton rounded out the first ten positions. Hamlin, who was quickest in the second session, could only manage 20th.

Race

The race, the twelfth in the season, began at 6:00 p.m. EDT and was televised live in the United States on Fox. Darrell Waltrip began pre-race ceremonies, by giving the invocation. Next, Charlotte Fire Department Pipe Bag played "Amazing Grace", then  Darius Rucker performed the national anthem. Afterward, retired U.S. Navy admiral, Frank Thorp and director of the United States Army Wounded Warrior Program, Gregory Gadson, with the addition of actress Brooklyn Decker gave the command for drivers to start their engines.

Following the traditional three pace laps, Phoenix Racing's Kurt Busch dropped to the rear of the grid due to changing to a backup car after crashing in qualifying. Richard Petty Motorsports teammates Almirola and Ambrose led the 43-car field to the green flag, the teammates swapped the lead for the first 8 laps until Roush Fenway Racing's Biffle assumed the top spot on lap 9 from Ambrose. While Ambrose retook the lead from Biffle on lap 15, Almirola steadily fell back to 5th place. By lap 23, Biffle retook the lead from Ambrose and moved out to a 1-second lead. On lap 41, Allmendinger was the first driver to pit in a series of green-flag pit stops. Biffle made his stop along with Johnson on lap 47 and was able to hold the lead after pit stops were completed.

The race continued under green, and drivers stopped for another round of pit stops between laps 87 and 97. Once again, Biffle was one of the last cars to pit, and came out with the lead, extending it to 4 seconds. On lap 111, the first caution of the race came out when debris was sighted on the backstretch. The leaders pitted, and Ambrose and Jamie McMurray took two right side tires on their stops to claim the top two spots. However, McMurray was forced back into the pits after the restart for a loose wheel. On lap 125, Kyle Busch grabbed the lead from Biffle, who took it back two laps later after Busch dipped the tires below the white line. Debris was spotted in turn 1, forcing the second caution of the race. All the leaders pitted except for Jeff Gordon. On the restart on lap 139, Busch, Johnson, and Biffle easily dispatched Gordon to take the top three spots. Kasey Kahne scores a victory in his 300th career start.

Results

Qualifying

Race results

Standings after the race

Drivers' Championship standings

Manufacturers' Championship standings

Note: Only the top five positions are included for the driver standings.

References

NASCAR races at Charlotte Motor Speedway
Coca-Cola 600
Coca-Cola 600
Coca-Cola 600